Reda Abdalaati Iguider (born 25 March 1987) is a Moroccan runner who specializes in the 1500 metres. Over 1500 metres, he is the bronze medalist from the London Olympic Games and the 2012 World Indoor Champion.
His personal best of 3:28:79 over 1500 metres, run in Monaco during the Herculis Diamond League Meeting on July 17, 2015 makes him the eighth fastest man ever over that distance.

Achievements

Personal bests
800 metres - 1:46.67 (2015)
1000 metres - 2:19.14 (2007)
1500 metres - 3:28.79 (2015)
Mile - 3:49.09 (2014)
3000 metres - 7:30.09 (2016)
5000 metres - 12:59.25 (2015)
1000 metres - Indoors - 2:19.33 (2005)
1500 metres Indoors - 3:34.10 (2012)
3000 metres Indoors - 7:34.92 (2013)

External links
 
 

1987 births
Living people
People from Errachidia
Moroccan male middle-distance runners
Moroccan male long-distance runners
Olympic athletes of Morocco
Olympic bronze medalists for Morocco
Olympic bronze medalists in athletics (track and field)
Athletes (track and field) at the 2008 Summer Olympics
Athletes (track and field) at the 2012 Summer Olympics
Athletes (track and field) at the 2016 Summer Olympics
Medalists at the 2012 Summer Olympics
World Athletics Championships athletes for Morocco
World Athletics Championships medalists
Mediterranean Games bronze medalists for Morocco
Mediterranean Games medalists in athletics
Athletes (track and field) at the 2009 Mediterranean Games
World Athletics Indoor Championships winners
Athletes (track and field) at the 2019 African Games
African Games competitors for Morocco
21st-century Moroccan people